{{DISPLAYTITLE:C4H8O4}}
The molecular formula C4H8O4 (molar mass: 120.10 g/mol, exact mass: 120.042259 u) may refer to:

Tetroses
 Erythrose
 Erythrulose (or D-Erythrulose)
 Threose

Molecular formulas